Žarko Marković (born 28 January 1987) is a Serbian footballer who plays for Omladinac Novi Banovci.

Career
On 20 December 2013, Marković signed a three-year contract with Kairat, extending his contract with Kairat on 26 October 2016 until the end of 2018. On 13 November 2017, Kairat announced that Marković had left the club by mutual agreement.

On 17 September 2021, he joined Omladinac Novi Banovci.

Career statistics

Honours
Kairat
Kazakhstan Cup (3): 2014, 2015, 2017
Kazakhstan Super Cup (2): 2016, 2017

References

External links
 Profile at Srbijafudbal.
 
 
 
 

1987 births
Living people
Footballers from Belgrade
Serbian footballers
Serbian expatriate footballers
Association football defenders
Expatriate footballers in Romania
Expatriate footballers in Kazakhstan
Serbian expatriate sportspeople in Romania
Liga I players
Kazakhstan Premier League players
Serbian SuperLiga players
FK BASK players
FK Inđija players
FK Radnik Surdulica players
FK Radnički Niš players
CS Gaz Metan Mediaș players
FC Kairat players
FK Železničar Pančevo players